The Brussels Gate is the sole remaining city gate of the original twelve gates of the city of Mechelen, Belgium.

This imposing structure dates from the 13th century. Because of its exceptional height, towering above the other gates, it was also called the 'Overste poort' (superior gate).  

In the 16th century, the towers were lowered and the roof construction was altered to the present configuration.

In the course of the centuries, the building had many different uses: from police station to youth center, from duty collector's office to artist's workshop (Alfred Ost).

External links
Brusselpoort

Gates in Belgium
Buildings and structures in Mechelen
Museums in Antwerp Province
History museums in Belgium